Bjarne Arnstein Brøndbo (born 19 September 1964 in Namsos, Norway) is the vocalist and the front figure in the Norwegian rock group D.D.E. since the start in 1992. Brøndbo has previously played in the bands Humanic (1978–1985) and After Dark (1984–1991). He is the brother of drummer Eskil Brøndbo and the cousin of the Electronica musician Rune "Sternklang" Brøndbo.

Education 

Bjarne Brøndbo took an education to become a teacher, but after his music career became successful he hasn't worked much in that profession. He has his own company, Namdal bilopphoggeri, a car breakers and online car spares company. He is married and has three children.

Discography

Album 
1993 D.D.E. Rai-Rai
1994 D.D.E. Rai 2
1996 D.D.E. Det går likar no
1998 D.D.E. OHWÆÆÆÆÆH !!!
1999 D.D.E. No e D.D.E. jul igjen
2000 D.D.E. Jippi'''
2001 D.D.E. Vi ska fæst — aill' mot aill'2003 D.D.E. Vi e konga (Percussion)
2005 D.D.E. Næ næ næ næ næ næ Live albums/compilations 
1995 D.D.E. Det è D.D.E. (live)
2002 D.D.E. Her bli de liv-det beste 1992–2002''

References

External links 
dde.no
mic.no Article from the Norwegian pop and rock dictionary

1964 births
Living people
Norwegian pop musicians
Norwegian-language singers
Musicians from Namsos